The 2022 Ivy League Baseball Championship Series was held on May 21 and 22 at Meiklejohn Stadium in Philadelphia, Pennsylvania, the home field of Penn, the team with the best regular season record.  The series matched the top two teams from the Ivy League's round robin regular season.  The winner of the series, Columbia, claimed the Ivy League's automatic berth in the 2022 NCAA Division I baseball tournament.

Results
Game One

Game Two

Game Three

References

Tournament
Ivy League Baseball Championship Series
Ivy League Baseball Championship